is a Japanese voice actress who works for Honey Rush from August 2007. She worked for Arts Vision until 1998. She also worked for Mausu Promotion (formerly known as Ezaki Productions) from 1998 to June 2007.

Notable voice roles 
 Rei Ijuuin in Tokimeki Memorial
 Sailor Star Maker/Kou Taiki in Sailor Moon Sailor Stars
 Natsu Ayuhara in Rival Schools
 Venat in Final Fantasy XII
 Kuriyo Urima/Riyo Urimaku in Crayon Shin-chan

Tokusatsu 
 AP717 in B-Robo Kabutack, B-Robo Kabutack: The Epic Christmas Battle
 Medoumedou (ep. 2, 23 - 24) in Seijuu Sentai Gingaman

Dubbing 
 Officer Jane in Die Hard with a Vengeance (Fuji TV edition)

External links
 
Bara no Toiki
A Tsunoda Narumi Shrine
http://www.imdb.com/name/nm0875424/

1962 births
Living people
People from Tokyo
Japanese video game actresses
Japanese voice actresses